Chippewa Township is one of the sixteen townships of Wayne County, Ohio, United States.  The 2000 census found 7,078 people in the township.

Geography
Located in the northeastern corner of the county, it borders the following townships and cities:
Wadsworth Township, Medina County - north
Norton - northeast
New Franklin - east
Lawrence Township, Stark County - southeast
Baughman Township - south
Green Township - southwest corner
Milton Township - west

Three municipalities are located in Chippewa Township but are not part of the Township:
The village of Doylestown, in the north
Part of the village of Marshallville, in the south
Part of the city of Rittman, in the northwest

Name and history
It is the only Chippewa Township statewide.

Government
The township is governed by a three-member board of trustees, who are elected in November of odd-numbered years to a four-year term beginning on the following January 1. Two are elected in the year after the presidential election and one is elected in the year before it. There is also an elected township fiscal officer, who serves a four-year term beginning on April 1 of the year after the election, which is held in November of the year before the presidential election. Vacancies in the fiscal officership or on the board of trustees are filled by the remaining trustees.

References

External links
Township website
County website
Wayne County township map

Townships in Wayne County, Ohio
Townships in Ohio